Mentzelia candelariae is a wildflower native to Nevada. It has been found in the counties of Churchill, Esmeralda, Mineral, Nye, and Pershing. It is known by the common name candelaria blazingstar.

Description
It grows in "sparsely vegetated washes, steep slopes, hilltops, gravelly, clayey, and sandy soils composed of volcanic ash." It is characterized as an erect perennial herb with white-hairy stems. Plants are generally between 6-14 inches tall. The leaves are up to 3 inches long, are obovate to lanceolate, and have serrate margins. The inflorescence resembles a candelabra, with  bright yellow flowers in bloom between May and June.

References

Flora of Nevada
candelariae
Plants described in 1984